HMS Prince of Wales was one of six 121-gun screw-propelled first-rate three-decker line-of-battle ships of the Royal Navy.  She was launched on 25 January 1860.

In 1869 she was renamed HMS Britannia and under that name served at Dartmouth as a cadet training ship until 1905.

History
The Prince of Wales was originally a 3,186 ton 120 gun design by John Edye and Isaac Watts for a modified Queen-class sailing line-of-battle ship.  She was laid down at Portsmouth on 10 June 1848, although she was not formally ordered until 29 June, and the design was approved on 28 July 1848.

In 1849, the Royal Navy started ordering screw line-of-battle ships starting with the Agamemnon.  It is possible that construction of Prince of Wales was suspended, as screw line-of-battle ships laid down after her, were completed before her. Prince of Wales was reordered to complete as a 121 gun screw line-of-battle ship on 9 April 1856, conversion work started on 27 October 1856.  Her half-sisters Duke of Wellington and Royal Sovereign were lengthened with an extra 23 ft amidships and 8 ft in the run, and originally it was intended that Marlborough and Prince of Wales would be converted to the same plans, but they were further lengthened during construction.

Her engines were 800 nhp Penn two-cylinder (82 inch diameter, 4 ft stroke) horizontal single expansion trunk engines.

She was launched on 25 January 1860, and did her trials at sea in Stokes Bay on 31 October 1860 unrigged.  She made an average of 12.569 knots (23.293 km/h ).

Prince of Wales was completed toward the end of the unarmoured phase of a naval arms race between Britain and France.  In 1860 the Royal Navy had more wooden steam line-of-battle ships than it needed to man in peacetime.  The Royal Navy's first armoured line-of-battle ship, Warrior was commissioned in 1861.  Unarmoured screw line-of-battle ships were still of value in the early to mid-1860s, and several new screw line-of-battle ships were commissioned in the 1860s.

In 1867, the Prince of Waless engines were removed so they could be installed in the ironclad Repulse. 

In 1869 she was renamed Britannia and began service as a cadet training ship at Dartmouth, replacing the previous Britannia in that role.  As Britannia, she was a hulk, and had only her foremast. Among those starting their naval careers on her were, in 1877, the future Admiral and First Sea Lord Rosslyn Wemyss, Prince Albert Victor, and his younger brother, the future King George V.

A shore-based college at Dartmouth was opened in September 1905 and this was named Royal Naval College, Dartmouth.  The Britannia training establishment was closed at the same time.

A new King Edward VII-class battleship called Britannia was launched in December 1904.  The former Prince of Wales was officially hulked in September 1909, sold to Garnham on 23 September 1914, then resold to Hughes Bolckow arriving at Blyth in July 1916 for breaking up. In 1917 her "wreck" was etched by Frank Brangwyn, a print of which can be seen in Bruges' Groeningemuseum today.

The figurehead of the ship, depicting the Prince of Wales, survives and can be seen at the Scottish Maritime Museum in Irvine.

Notes

References
 Lambert, Andrew   Battleships in Transition, the Creation of the Steam Battlefleet 1815-1860,  published Conway Maritime Press, 1984.  
 Lyon, David and Winfield, Rif The Sail and Steam Navy List, All the Ships of the Royal Navy 1815-1889, published Chatham, 2004,

External links
 

Ships of the line of the Royal Navy
1860 ships
Victorian-era ships of the line of the United Kingdom